Kapitänleutnant, short: KptLt/in lists: KL, is an officer grade of the captains' military hierarchy group of the German Bundeswehr. The rank is rated OF-2 in NATO, and equivalent to Hauptmann in the Heer and Luftwaffe. It is grade A11 or A12 in the pay rules of the Federal Ministry of Defence.

Address
In line with ZDv 10/8, the formal manner of addressing people with the rank Kapitänleutnant (OF-2) is "Herr/Frau Kapitänleutnant". However, in German tradition and in line with seamen's language, the title is abbreviated to "Herr/Frau Kaleu" in verbal communication (contemporary usage). Historically, in the Wehrmacht, the abbreviation spoken was "Herr Kaleun".

Rank and assignment

The United States Navy's rank of lieutenant is equal to Kapitänleutnant in NATO's military hierarchy (classed as OF-2). However German Navy Kapitänleutnant might be assigned to the so-called “line officer career” (de: Truppendienstlaufbahn or Truppendienstoffizier) or “officer specialist career” (de: Fachdienstlaufbahn or Fachdienstoffizier, officially: Offizier des militärfachlichen Dienstes).

Its rank insignia, worn on the sleeves and shoulders, are one golden five-pointed star above two golden stripes with one half stripes between them (without the star when rank loops are worn).

Line Officer career
A Kapitänleutnant (line officer) may command smaller ships (e.g. submarine class 206A, minehunter class 332) or serve as principal warfare officer on larger warships, giving the rank responsibilities more along those of a Lieutenant commander in the U.S. or Royal navies.

The sequence of ranks (top-down approach) in that particular group is as follows:
OF-5: Kapitän zur See / Oberst
OF-4: Fregattenkapitän / Oberstleutnant
OF-3: Korvettenkapitän / Major
OF-2: Kapitänleutnant / Hauptmann

Officer Specialist career
Kapitänleutnant might be a senior officer specialist rank, comparable to US warrant officer, however, junior to Stabskapitänleutnant.
Military people of the “line officer career” skip over the rank Stabskapitänleutnant, by regular promotion from Kapitänleutnant (OF-2) to Korvettenkapitän (OF-3).

The sequence of ranks (top-down approach) in that particular group is as follows:
OF-2a: Stabskapitänleutnant / Stabshauptmann
OF-2b: Kapitänleutnant / Hauptmann
OF-1a: Oberleutnant zur See / Oberleutnant
OF-1b: Leutnant zur See / Leutnant

References

Naval ranks of Germany